Stureby metro station is on the Green line of the Stockholm metro, located in Stureby, Söderort. The provisional station was inaugurated on 1 October 1930 as the southern terminus of the stretch from Gullmarsplan, and the current permanent station was inaugurated on 1 October 1953. On 22 November 1954, the extension south to Högdalen was open.

A southerly extension of the Blue line of the Stockholm metro is currently under construction and expected to be opened for the passengers in 2030. As part of this development, the Blue line will take over this station.

References

External links
Images of Stureby station

Green line (Stockholm metro) stations
Railway stations opened in 1930